Svend Jørgensen (24 December 1904 – 10 June 1992) was a Danish field hockey player. He competed in the men's tournament at the 1948 Summer Olympics.

References

External links
 

1904 births
1992 deaths
Danish male field hockey players
Olympic field hockey players of Denmark
Field hockey players at the 1948 Summer Olympics
People from Holbæk Municipality
Sportspeople from Region Zealand